René Gavinet (March 26, 1921 – September 12, 2018) was a French slalom canoeist who competed in the 1940s and the 1950s.

He won a silver medal in the mixed C-2 event at the 1955 ICF Canoe Slalom World Championships in Tacen. He also won two gold medals in the C-2 team event, one at the 1949 ICF Canoe Slalom World Championships in Geneva and the other at the 1953 ICF Canoe Slalom World Championships in Meran.

References

1921 births
2018 deaths
French male canoeists
Medalists at the ICF Canoe Slalom World Championships